Peter Cornell (né Boyle; born April 19, 1961) is an American singer, songwriter, and musician.

Biography 
Cornell was born Peter Boyle on April 19, 1961, in Seattle, Washington, where he was raised. His parents are Edward F. Boyle, a pharmacist of Irish Catholic descent, and Karen Cornell, an accountant of Jewish background and self-proclaimed psychic.

Cornell was one of six children; he had two brothers and three younger sisters. He was Chris Cornell's older brother. After his parents' divorce when he was a teenager, he and his siblings adopted their mother's maiden name, Cornell, as their surname. With his brother Chris, he listened to The Beatles, The Who, The Guess Who, Led Zeppelin and Pink Floyd. "We both listened to the Beatles and Zepp I think he liked Rush  more and I was a Bowie fan." At the age of 20 he learned to play guitar. "I had desire to learn how to write a song [...]. I learned every Beatles song I could."

In the 90's, he used to sing with his sisters Suzy (percussion/vocals) and Katy (flute/vocals) Cornell in a band called Inflatable Soule managed by Susan Silver (Soundgarden, Alice in Chains). In 2001 he moved to New York City. With bassist Keith Mannino, he created hard rock band Black Market Radio. "When I wrote BMR I listened to only three things; The Complete Zepp catalogue, the first Cars record, and Alice Cooper's greatest hits."

In 2014 he released his first solo album Champion, featuring Pearl Jam's drummer Dave Abbruzzese on drums. For this bluesy rock album he "listened to a ton of Curtis Mayfield (didn't influence the sound of my record) Chris Cornell's solo records, Alain Johannes, STP, and all things Zepp [...]. I built my own studio and wrote and played everything myself (except for drums which came later)." Two songs appeared in The Vampire Diaries: "Madman" (episode 19, season 6) and "Wash" (episode 4, season 8).

After the death of his brother Chris in 2017, Peter Cornell started a campaign to raise awareness on depression and suicide prevention.<ref>[https://www.alternativenation.net/chris-cornell-brother-threatened-bullied/ Chris Cornell's Brother Is Being 'Threatened' And 'Bullied'''], alternativenation, June 27, 2017, retrieved September 18, 2020</ref>

In 2021, he co-wrote, with Kevin Martin, the single "Let Me Down Easy" and produced the acoustic version of the song "Riptide" for Candlebox's new album "Wolves".PETER CORNELL & CHRIS CORNELL'S TOURING CELLIST REUNITE FOR CANDLEBOX SONG, bravewords.com, September 2, 2021 He became an entrepreneur and opened the Cornell Brothers Coffee Espresso Bar in Nolensville, Tennessee in memory of his late grandfather and three uncles.New coffee bar, Cornell Brothers, gives Nolensville drink snobs and novices a new taste, eu.tennessean.com, September 18, 2021

 Personal life 
Cornell is married to veteran music industry executive and former Soundgarden manager Amy Decker.

 Discography 
 Inflatable Soule 
 1993: Inflatable Soule 1994: So Sad 1996: Golden Boy Somnambulist 
 2001: The Paranormal Humidor Black Market Radio 
 2006: Suicide Parlour 2007: Better than a Killer Solo 
 1998: Grace, EP
 2014: Champion Collaboration 
 2021: Let Me Down Easy'' for Candlebox

References

External links
 
 Discogs

1961 births
20th-century American guitarists
20th-century American singers
21st-century American guitarists
21st-century American singers
Alternative metal guitarists
Alternative metal singers
Alternative rock guitarists
Alternative rock singers
American alternative rock musicians
American hard rock musicians
American heavy metal guitarists
American heavy metal singers
American male guitarists
American male singer-songwriters
American people of Irish descent
American rock guitarists
American rock songwriters
Guitarists from Washington (state)
American people of Jewish descent
Musicians from Seattle
Living people
20th-century American male singers
21st-century American male singers
Singer-songwriters from Washington (state)